Ameno may refer to:

Ameno, Italy, a comune in the Province of Novara, Piedmont, Italy
Lacco Ameno, a town and comune situated in the northwest of the island of Ischia, in the Gulf of Naples, Italy
"Ameno" (song), a song by musical project Era

See also
Amen
Amen (disambiguation)
Ameno-sagiri, a character in the video game Shin Megami Tensei: Persona 4